Diego López Rivera (21 November 1952) is a Mexican filmmaker. For his film Goitia, Un Dios Para Sí Mismo (1989), López earned the Ariel Award for Best Director and Best Picture.

Filmography

References

External links
 

1952 births
Ariel Award winners
Best Director Ariel Award winners
Mexican film directors
Mexican screenwriters
Spanish-language film directors
Living people